Danzón No. 2 is an orchestral composition by Mexican composer Arturo Márquez. Along with Carlos Chávez's Sinfonia India and Silvestre Revueltas' Sensemaya, Danzón No. 2 is one of the most popular and most frequently performed orchestral Mexican contemporary classical music compositions. Danzón No. 2 gained great popularity worldwide when the Simón Bolívar Youth Orchestra of Venezuela under Gustavo Dudamel included it on their programme for their 2007 European and American tour.

Written for full orchestra, the piece features solos for clarinet, oboe, piano, violin, double bass, French horn, trumpet, flute, and piccolo. The piece has also gained an important spot in the modern concert band literature through Oliver Nickel's arrangement.

Danzón No. 2 was commissioned by the National Autonomous University of Mexico and was premiered in 1994 in Mexico City by the Orchestra Filarmonica de la UNAM under the direction of Francisco Savín. The rhythmic interest in the piece is maintained through the use of varying accents and tempo. This staple of the contemporary Mexican music literature expresses and reflects on the dance style named danzón, which has its origins in Cuba but is a very important part of the folklore of the Mexican state of Veracruz. The music was inspired by a visit to a ballroom in Veracruz.

A short film of the same name was made in 2009 by Mexican filmmaker Guillermo Ortiz Pichardo, using the piece as the main narrative device, in a Fantasia-like manner. It is set in Mexico City in the 1940s, the golden age of danzón, and the style is an homage to the Mexican cinema of the period. The film features Arturo Márquez in a cameo as the pianist of the dance-hall. It was premiered at the 8th Morelia International Film Festival as part of its official lineup.

The piece is included in the Amazon Video streaming service series Mozart in the Jungle in season two, episode six. A youth orchestra in Mexico City plays it under the direction of Rodrigo De Souza (a character based on Gustavo Dudamel), a talented young conductor and former member of the youth orchestra.

References

External links 
 Making Of Danzón No. 2 Interview about the making of a short film with his famous piece, in Spanish

Danzón
Mexican music